Riversdale Beach is a settlement in New Zealand. It is located on the sparsely populated southeast coast of the North Island, 40 kilometres east of Masterton. It is one of the longest beaches in the Wairarapa and is also known for having a year-round surf.

Demographics
Riversdale Beach is part of the Whareama statistical area.

References

Populated places in the Wellington Region
Masterton District
Wairarapa